Nelstrops Albion Flour Mills, also known as Nelstrop Albion Corn Mill, Nelstrop's Flour Mill or Albion Mills, is a corn mill in Heaton Norris, Stockport, England. It is at the top of Lancashire Hill, on the roundabout next to the Navigation Inn. Nelstrops, the company which operates the mills, is one of the leading producers of flour in the United Kingdom.

History

The first mill on the site was built in
1820 by William Nelstrop. It ran on steam power, using water from the Ashton Canal. A major fire on 5 April 1893 gutted the building, which was rebuilt the following year.

Production

The mill uses wheat from East Anglia, and imports Manitoba wheat from Canada and Spring wheat from the USA, which is brought by ship to Seaforth Dock in Liverpool and then brought to Stockport in 20 tonne bulk wheat lorries, typically 1600 tonnes a week. The flour produced at the mill is typically sold to local bakers and supermarkets in England and exported to Nigeria, Egypt and Jordan.

References

External links
Official site

Flour mills in the United Kingdom
Buildings and structures in Stockport